Neoperiboeum is a genus of beetles in the family Cerambycidae, containing the following species:

 Neoperiboeum juanitae Chemsak, 1991
 Neoperiboeum villosulum (Bates, 1872)

References

Elaphidiini